The Michigan Wolverines softball program is a college softball team that represents the University of Michigan in the Big Ten Conference in the National Collegiate Athletic Association. The team has had three head coaches since it started playing organized softball in the 1975 season. The current coach is Bonnie Tholl, who took over the head coaching position in 2023.

Key

Coaches

Notes

References

Lists of college softball head coaches in the United States

Michigan Wolverines softball coaches